Robicheaux is a surname of Cajun French derivation.

People
 Coco Robicheaux (1947–2011), U.S. blues musician
 Ron Robicheaux, a U.S. baseball player from the Louisiana Ragin' Cajuns drafted by the Pittsburgh Pirates in 1986

Fictional characters
 Dave Robicheaux, a fictional character created by James Lee Burke
 Goodnight "Goody" Robicheaux, a fictional character from the 2016 film The Magnificent Seven
 John Robichaux, a fictional character from the TV soap opera Days of Our Lives
 Melinda Robicheaux, a fictional character from the 2004 film Melinda and Melinda
 Miss Robicheaux, founder of “Miss Robichaux's Academy for Exceptional Young Ladies” from the TV show American Horror Story

See also

 Robicheaux v. Caldwell, a same-sex marriage case in Louisiana
 Robicheaux v. George, a same-sex marriage case in Louisiana
 Miss Robicheaux's Academy, a fictional location in the 2018 U.S. TV show American Horror Story: Apocalypse; see List of American Horror Story: Apocalypse characters
 
 -eaux
 Robichaud
 Robichaux
 Robicheau